Thomas Luke Macfarlane (born January 19, 1980) is a Canadian-American actor and former singer. He is known for playing Scotty Wandell on the ABC television drama Brothers & Sisters (2006–2011), RAC Agent D'avin Jaqobis on the Space television science fiction series Killjoys (2015–2019) and the romantic lead in a number of Hallmark Channel movies.

Early life and education
Thomas Luke Macfarlane was born on 19 January 1980, in London, Ontario. His father Thomas was the Director of Student Health Services at the University of Western Ontario, and his mother Penny is a mental health nurse at a London hospital. Macfarlane attended London Central Secondary School with twin sister, Ruth, and older sister Rebecca. Macfarlane went to school at the Lester B. Pearson School for the Arts, then later studied drama at Juilliard in New York City.

Career
Macfarlane had an early role playing opposite Cynthia Nixon in Robert Altman's miniseries Tanner on Tanner on the Sundance Channel. He subsequently had leading roles on the 2005 FX series Over There (playing PV2 Frank "Dim" Dumphy) and in the 2009 two-part miniseries titled Iron Road.

Macfarlane first notable role was as Scotty Wandell on ABC's Brothers & Sisters, husband to Kevin Walker (played by Matthew Rhys), one of the "brothers" of the show. Macfarlane's other notable television roles include Jason Howell in the Canadian sitcom Satisfaction, Rick Lincoln on NBC's The Night Shift, Chaplain Hopkins on PBS's Mercy Street and the starring role of D'avin Jaqobis in Syfy's Killjoys.

Macfarlane has also starred in TV movies, such as Hallmark Channel's The Memory Book, Christmas Land, Maggie's Miracle Christmas, The Birthday Wish, and The Mistletoe Promise (2016).

He co-starred in a major film release, Bros, with Billy Eichner in 2022.

Stage
Macfarlane was one of the four leads in Juvenilia at the Playwrights Horizons Theater from November 14–December 21, 2003. He played the lead role in the American premiere of the play Where Do We Live, staged at the Vineyard Theatre in May 2004. The production was cited by the 2005 GLAAD Media Awards for Outstanding New York Theatre: Broadway and Off-Broadway. He also appeared with Jill Clayburgh and Hamish Linklater in the off-Broadway production of The Busy World is Hushed, again at Playwrights Horizons, in Summer 2006. He reprised his role of Thomas for the L.A. Premiere at the Skirball Cultural Center from February 7–11 of 2007.

Macfarlane was part of the one-night celebrity performed staging of Howard Ashman's unproduced musical Dreamstuff. The musical was re-imagined by Howard's partners Marsha Malamet and Dennis Green and performed one night only at Los Angeles' Hayworth Theatre as part of the Bruno Kirby celebrity reading series, directed by actor Michael Urie. Luke starred in the show alongside Eden Espinosa, Vicki Lewis, Fred Willard and David Blue.

Macfarlane starred in the world premiere of stage drama Reverberation in February 2015 at Hartford Stage in Connecticut.

Music career

Macfarlane was the lead singer and a songwriter for the band Fellow Nameless, which began in his 8th grade along with some of his classmates at Lester B. Pearson School for the Arts under the name of Slipnaught, a name they randomly chose from a dictionary because they did not have a name for the band when it came time to perform on stage. Fellow Nameless came from Slipnaught mainly because the band members hated the original name, and so, Fellow Nameless was born at London Central Secondary School. Fellow Nameless has produced one underground album, which was a half-studio, half-live CD album, and they recorded an additional ten songs that never got put out including three songs that were recorded for a development deal with Maverick Records. They played a showcase for Danny Strick A&R of Maverick Records and in the end got passed over. The once thought of as defunct London, Ontario based band, Fellow Nameless, later had two incarnations without Macfarlane as lead singer. The first incarnation came in the second quarter of 2004 with the creation of Van A Primer and a new singer, Matthew Pearn. Their most recent incarnation, as of March, 2006, has three of the remaining band members under the new band name of Cancel Winter.

Personal life
Macfarlane came out as gay during an interview with The Globe and Mail on 15 April 2008. On 12 June 2018, Macfarlane was naturalized as an American citizen.

Macfarlane plays the cello, and this skill was used in the Hallmark movie Chateau Christmas. He also plays the trumpet.

Filmography

Theatre

References

External links

 
 
 
 Side Dish – Luke Macfarlane's character blog for Scotty Wandell

1980 births
20th-century Canadian LGBT people
21st-century American male actors
21st-century Canadian male actors
21st-century Canadian LGBT people
American male film actors
American male stage actors
American male television actors
Canadian emigrants to the United States
Canadian gay actors
Canadian male film actors
Canadian male stage actors
Canadian male television actors
Juilliard School alumni
Canadian LGBT singers
Living people
Male actors from London, Ontario
Naturalized citizens of the United States